Mississippi Highway 76 (MS 76) is an east-west state highway in Itawamba County, Mississippi. It is a section of Mississippi's portion of Corridor V, part of the Appalachian Development Highway System, connecting with Alabama's SR 24 section at the state line.

Though proposed as a 4-lane connection for SR 24 (and all of northeast Alabama) to Fulton, Tupelo, and I-22, it currently only extends  from the state line to MS 23.

Route description 

The highway travels through wooded hilly terrain, passing by a couple farms and crossing a small creek (Ray Branch), before continuing into Franklin County, Alabama as SR 24

History 

The MS 76 designation originated as a temporary designation for the  western portion of the MS 6/US 278 Pontotoc bypass (also known as the Pontotoc Parkway) in Pontotoc, more specifically the section between MS 6/US 278 and the interchange at MS 9. It existed between 1996 until the designation was dropped when the rest of the highway was finished all the way to Tupelo at US 45 in 2014. It too was a 4-lane divided highway, and is also a section of Corridor V. The  section between MS 6/US 278 on the west side of town to MS 15 was the first to open, with a  extension to MS 9 opening in 1998. This MS 76 designation remained unsigned until the year 2000. The current MS 76 was opened in 2013 alongside the opening of SR 24's Red Bay, Alabama bypass.

Future 

The highway will be a four-lane divided highway with grassy median, just like the current section, and is being entirely built on near terrain, though it does roughly follow the path of Fairview Banner Road. This will fill the final gap in Corridor V and complete the highway. It was originally scheduled to start in 2011, but was delayed due to funding concerns. The project is expected to be completed by the end of 2023.

Major intersections

References 

076
Transportation in Itawamba County, Mississippi